John Carney (1906 - November 1984) was an Irish Gaelic footballer and trainer. His league and championship career at senior level with the Mayo county team spanned ten years from 1931 to 1941.

Carney made his debut on the inter-county scene when he was selected for the Mayo senior team during the 1930–31 league. After being dropped from the team the following year he was recalled in 1933 after winning an All-Ireland medal with the Mayo junior team. Over the course of the next eight seasons, Carney won one All-Ireland medals as left wing-forward on the team in 1936. He also won five Connacht medals and seven National Football League medals. He played his last game for Mayo in June 1941.

As a regular member of the Connacht inter-provincial team, Carney won a total of four Railway Cup medals.

Carney was appointed co-trainer of the Mayo senior team along with Gerald Courell in 1948. His tenure in charge saw the team win back-to-back All-Ireland titles in 1950 and 1951.

Carney's nephew, Martin, had a lengthy inter-county career with Donegal and Mayo.

Career statistics

Honours

Mayo
All-Ireland Senior Football Championship (1): 1936 (c)
Connacht Senior Football Championship (5): 1931, 1935, 1936 (c), 1937, 1939
National Football League (7): 1933-34, 1934-35, 1935-36 (c), 1936-37, 1937-38, 1938-39, 1940-41
All-Ireland Junior Football Championship (1): 1933
Connacht Junior Football Championship (5): 1933

Connacht
Railway Cup (4): 1934, 1936, 1937, 1938

References

1906 births
1984 deaths
Ballina Stephenites Gaelic footballers
Connacht inter-provincial Gaelic footballers
Drinking establishment owners
Irish businesspeople in retailing
Mayo inter-county Gaelic footballers
People from Ballina, County Mayo
Winners of one All-Ireland medal (Gaelic football)